Chongqing–Wanzhou high-speed railway is the second route between Chongqing and Wanzhou after Chongqing–Wanzhou intercity railway. The Chongqing–Wanzhou high-speed railway, on a faster  alignment, is expected to open in 2025. It will take a different route, heading south to serve Zhongxian and Fengdu with new railway stations and interchanging with the existing Fuling North railway station and terminating at Chongqing East.

On 2 July 2018, initial plans for the railway, with seven stations, were unveiled. Geological surveys began in 2020. The plans have been revised and the line will now have five stations. It is expected to be completed by 2025.

Stations

References

High-speed railway lines in China